List of kings of Yemen could refer to:

 List of rulers of Saba and Himyar
 Imams of Yemen